Austin Powers Pinball is a pinball-based video game released in 2002 and 2003 for PlayStation and Windows. The game is thematically based on the first two installments in the Austin Powers series of films and features two playable pinball machines: one for the original movie, Austin Powers: International Man of Mystery, and one for the second movie, Austin Powers: The Spy Who Shagged Me. The third film, Austin Powers in Goldmember, released months before Pinball but is not featured.

Austin Powers Pinball is the fourth video game in the Austin Powers series, following Austin Powers Operation: Trivia, Austin Powers: Oh, Behave!, and Austin Powers: Welcome to My Underground Lair!. It received mixed reviews upon release.

Gameplay
Dr. Evil has his sights set on defeating Austin once and for all, and the best way to end the threat this time is by racking up a few points on the old pinball table. Using the flippers will help the player destroy the fembots, escape the mutant sea bass, and more. If the player makes it to the Moonbase Showdown, they will take on the toughest enemies.

Development and release
On December 19, 2002, Global Star Software announced Austin Powers Pinball for a February 2003 release on PC. Copies of this version, developed by Wildfire Studios, were shipped by January 30, 2003.

Reception

The game was met with very mixed to negative reception. In a January 2003 review by Sam Kennedy of Official U.S. PlayStation Magazine, Kennedy stated that Austin Powers Pinball "does an adequate job of representing a real pinball machine" and called the controls "spot-on". He lamented that "what's really missing here is the humor of the films [...] Everything fits, but there's no wit or excitement. Even the music, though Austin Powers-ish, seems stale." GameRankings gave it a score of 51% for the PC version, and 43% for the PlayStation version.

References

External links
 
 Wildfire Studios

2002 video games
Pinball
Pinball video games
PlayStation (console) games
Windows games
Multiplayer and single-player video games
Video games developed in Australia